Alfred "Alf" Barraclough (birth unknown – death unknown) was a rugby union, and professional rugby league footballer who played in the 1890s. He played representative level rugby union (RU) for Yorkshire, and at club level for Manningham FC (captain), and representative level rugby league (RL) for Yorkshire, and at club level for Manningham FC. Prior to Tuesday 27 August 1895, Manningham was a rugby union club, it then became a rugby league club, and since Friday 29 May 1903 it has been the association football (soccer) club Bradford City.

Playing career

County honours
Alf Barraclough won cap(s) for Yorkshire while at Manningham, in William Barnes Wollen's painting The Rugby Match, featuring Yorkshire's 11-3 victory over Lancashire during the 1893/94 season, a painting that is now held at the Rugby Football Union headquarters in the Twickenham Stadium, Alf Barraclough can be seen being tackled, and passing the ball to Jack Toothill, with Tommy Dobson on the outside, although Tommy Dobson did not actually participate in this particular match.

Championship appearances
Alf Barraclough was the captain in Manningham FC's Championship victory during the 1895–96 season.

Change of Code
Manningham converted from the rugby union code to the rugby league code on Tuesday 27 August 1895, consequently, he was both a rugby union and rugby league footballer for Manningham.

References

External links
Search for "Barraclough" at scrum.com

English rugby league players
English rugby union players
Manningham F.C. captains
Manningham F.C. players
Place of birth missing
Place of death missing
Year of birth missing
Year of death missing
Yorkshire County RFU players
Yorkshire rugby league team players